Clube Atlético Mirandense is a Portuguese sports club from Miranda do Corvo.

The men's football team plays in the I Séria A AF Coimbra. The team was promoted from the Terceira Divisão to the old third tier in Portugal, the 1990–91 Segunda Divisão B. After being relegated from the 1991–92 Segunda Divisão B the club played in the Terceira Divisão again. A stint in the third-tier 2006–07 Segunda Divisão followed, before two straight relegations from that and from the 2007–08 Terceira Divisão.

References

Football clubs in Portugal
Association football clubs established in 1947
1947 establishments in Portugal